The 1989 World Cup took place 16–19 November at Las Brisas Golf Club in Marbella, Spain. It was the 35th World Cup event. The tournament was shortened, due to rain, from 72 to 36 holes. Both the second round on Friday and the fourth round on Sunday were cancelled and only the Thursday and Saturday rounds were counted in the competition. The World Cup, previously named the Canada Cup, had been shortened before, due to bad weather; 1963, 1972 and 1984, but it was the first time since the event was instituted in 1953, that two full rounds were lost.

It was a stroke play team event with 32 teams. Each team consisted of two players from a country. The combined score of each team determined the team results. The Australia team of Peter Fowler and Wayne Grady won by three strokes over the Spain team of José María Cañizares and José María Olazábal.  The individual competition was won by Fowler. Beside the prize money mentioned, Fowler won additional US$10,000 for having the lowest individual score in the first round and the Australia team won additional US$10,000 for the lowest team score the first day.

Teams

Scores
Team

International Trophy

Sources:

References

World Cup (men's golf)
Golf tournaments in Spain
World Cup
World Cup